The Nikon Coolpix 4500 is a digital camera — the penultimate model in the famous 950-995 lineup of swivel lens models. The last model was the Nikon Coolpix S4, most of its features match the Nikon 995. The Coolpix 4500 was announced by Nikon on May 29, 2002.

It's a 4 MP model with 4x optical zoom lens and has many manual controls. Like its predecessors, it takes sharp photos (though some claim the 995 is sharper) and has a long shutter lag.

Its minimum focus range is 30 cm but reduced to 2 cm in macro mode.

Its automation manages 16 pre-programmed Scene modes to facilitate shooting (landscape, portrait, macro, sunset/moonlight, panorama assistant, text, museum, party/indoor, twilight, backlight, beach / snow, night portrait, combination of shots, fireworks, night, sports). Exposure adjustment is automatic and also allows for manual mode with adjustment within a range of ±2.0 in 0.33 EV increments.

The white balance is done automatically, but also semi-manually with pre-set options (sunny, incandescent light, fluorescent tubes, cloudy, flash).

Its built-in flash has an effective range of 0.5 to 3 m in wide-angle and 0.5 to 1.6 m in telephoto, and has a red-eye reduction function.

The “BSS” function (Best Shot Selector) selects from ten successive shots the best exposed image and saves automatically.

The “Noise reduction” function is automatically activated when the shutter speed is slow.

Its burst mode allows you to take 5 images per second.

Nikon stopped marketing in 2006.

See also 
 Nikon Coolpix 950
 Nikon Coolpix 995
 Nikon Coolpix S4

External links
Nikon Website
Reviews can also be checked out at DPreview, SteveDigicams etc.

4500
Cameras introduced in 2002